Pakistan participated at the 2018 Asian Para Games which was held in Jakarta, Indonesia from 6 to 13 October 2018. The team consisted of 4 athletes competed in athletics in which all three medals of the team: 2 golds and 1 bronze were won by one of its athletes, Haider Ali in Discus Throw, Javelin Throw and long jump events respectively.

Medalist

Medal by Sport

Medalist

See also
 Pakistan at the 2018 Asian Games

References

Nations at the 2018 Asian Para Games
2018 in Pakistani sport